The Minerals, Metals & Materials Society honors members with the designation Fellow for having made significant accomplishments to the field of materials science and engineering.

1963

 James Austin
 John Chipman
 Morris Cohen
 Lawrence Darken
 Walter R. Hibbard Jr.
 Augustus Kinzel
 Robert Mehl
 F. Richardson
 Reinardt Schuhmann Jr.
 Cyril Stanley Smith

1964

 Edgar Bain
 Charles Barrett
 Karl Fetters
 Francis Frary
 Zay Jeffries
 Thomas Joseph
 Charles Kuzell
 Champion Mathewson
 Ronald McNaughton
 Albert Phillips
 Leo Reinartz
 Earle Schumacher
 Robert Sosman
 Carl Wagner
 Clyde Williams

1965

 Paul Beck
 Bruce Chalmers
 G. Kurdyumov
 Carleton Long
 Oscar Marzke

1966

 Pol Duwez
 Werner Koster
 Earl Parker
 William Pfann
 Jack Scaff

1967

 Harold Emerick
 Sir Charles Goodeve
 Paul Queneau
 George Roberts
 J. Smart Jr.

1968

 Marc Allard
 Earl Bunce
 John Elliott
 Benjamin Lustman
 Lloyd Pidgeon

1969

 Gerhard Derge
 William Harris Jr.
 J. Hollomon
 Maurice Shank
 Kent Van Horn

1970

 John Dorn
 Frank Forward
 Bruce Gonser
 Michael Tenenbaum

1971

 Mars Fontana
 Maxwell Gensamer
 Julius Harwood
 Frederick Rhines
 David Swan

1972

 John Convey
 Robert Jaffee
 Herbert Kellogg
 Max Lightner
 William Manly

1973

 John Frye Jr.
 William Philbrook
 Raymond Smith

1974

 Tasuku Fuwa
 John Hirth
 John Low Jr.
 Albert Schlechten
 Clarence Sims

1975

 Morris Fine
 Thomas Ingraham
 James Keeler
 Thomas King
 Harold Paxton

1976

 James Fulton
 George St. Pierre
 Charles Taylor
 David Turnbull
 Milton Wadsworth
 Victor Zackay

1977

 Jagdish Agarwal
 W. Lankford Jr.
 Arthur Nowick
 William Opie
 Terkel Rosenqvist

1978

 Robert Balluffi
 Thomas Henrie
 Carl McHargue
 Frederick Rosi

1979

 Robert Lund
 Robert Maddin
 Allen Russell
 Paul Shewmon
 Gareth Thomas

1980

 Wayne Hazen
 Mats Hillert
 Eugene Machlin
 Dale Stein
 Jack Wernick

1981

 Charles Alcock
 George Ansell
 Gilbert Chin
 Jerome Cohen
 Nicholas Grant

1982

 G. Couch
 Robert Rapp

1983

 John Cahn
 Robert Pehlke
 Guy Pound
 Francis VerSnyder
 Charles Wert

1984

 Hubert Aaronson
 Charles McMahon Jr.
 Alexander Troiano

1985

 James Li
 Oleg Sherby

1986

 Ernest Peters

1987

 Kenneth Jackson
 U. Kocks

1988

 William Nix
 King-Ning Tu
 C. Wayman
 Fred Weinberg

1989

 J. Brimacombe
 Merton Flemings
 Thaddeus Massalski
 E. Verink Jr.

1990

 Karl Gschneidner Jr.
 John Kirkaldy
 Nikolas Themelis
 Johannes Weertman
 Albert Westwood

1991

 Y. Chang
 William Leslie
 Takeshi Nagano
 Peter Tarassoff
 Ethem Turkdogan

1992

 J. Embury
 Bhakta Rath
 John Stringer

1993

 George Dieter
 Julian Szekely
 Julia Weertman

1994

 Martin Glicksman
 Chain Liu
 Vladimir Mackiw

1995

 Howard Birnbaum
 Robert Mehrabian

1996

 John J. Gilman
 William Mullins
 Frans Spaepen
 David Williams

1997

 Alan Ardell
 Carolyn Hansson
 Terence Mitchell
 David Seidman

1998

 Richard Arsenault
 Ye Chou
 Siegfried Hecker
 Ryoichi Kikuchi*
 James Williams

1999

 Subhash Mahajan
 Jagdish Narayan
 Vaclav Vitek

2000

 Reza Abbaschian
 Robert Cahn*
 Lionel Kimerling
 Subra Suresh
 Jeffrey Wadsworth

2001

 Stan David
 Sungho Jin
 Carl Koch
 John Morris Jr.
 Gregory Olson

2002

 Gary Purdy
 Ricardo Schwarz
 Changxu Shi*
 Edgar Starke
 Man Yoo*

2003

 Hans Conrad
 Didier de Fontaine
 William Johnson
 George Krauss
 Robert Wagoner

2004

 Michael Baskes
 Ronald Gibala
 Tai-Gang Nieh
 John Perepezko
 Robert O. Ritchie

2005

 Hamish Fraser
 Terence Langdon
 Alton Romig

2006

 Diran Apelian
 Clyde Briant
 Doris Kuhlmann-Wilsdorf

2007

 William Boettinger
 Roger Doherty
 Armen Khachaturyan
 Stephen Pearton
 Erland Schulson

2008

 Tsu-Wei Chou
 Campbell Laird
 David Laughlin
 S. Semiatin

2009

 William Gerberich
 Douglas Granger
 Michael Miller
 Tresa Pollock
 Hong Yong Sohn

2010

 Jeff DeHosson
 James Evans
 Easo George
 Richard Hoagland
 Philip Mackey

2011

 David Bourell
 Kazuhiro Hono
 Marc A. Meyers
 Anthony Rollett
 Steven Zinkle

2012

 Ian Baker
 David Dunand
 Sung Kang
 Pradeep Rohatgi

2013

 George T. Gray III
 Robert Shull
 David Srolovitz
 Peter Voorhees

2014

 John Allison
 Kevin Hemker
 Enrique Lavernia
 Michel Rappaz
 Ruslan Valiev

2015

 Iver Anderson
 Surya Kalidindi
 David Matlock
 Michael Mills
 Christopher Schuh
 Barry Welch

2016

 Brajendra Mishra
 G. Odette
 George Pharr
 Ian Robertson
 James Smialek
 Bruce Wessels

2017

 Long-Qing Chen
 Ke Lu
 Gary Was
 Yuntian Zhu

2018

 Gerbrand Ceder
 Brent Fultz
 Carol Handwerker
 Peter Liaw
 Daniel Miracle
 Ray Peterson

2019

 Thomas Bieler
 M. Grace Burke
 Frank Crossley
 Dennis Dimiduk
 Roderick Guthrie
 Elizabeth A. Holm
 Nack Joon Kim
 Alan Taub
 Dan J. Thoma

2020

 Mark Asta
 Rodney Boyer
 Marc De Graef
 Diana Farkas
 Dorte Juul Jensen
 Karl Kainer
 David McDowell
 Neville Moody

2021

 Dipankar Banerjee
 Raymond Decker
 David DeYoung
 Fiona Doyle
 Somnath Ghosh
 Hani Henein
 Donald Sadoway
 Julie Schoenung

References 

Fellows of the Minerals, Metals & Materials Society